David Brinley Clay Jones, OBE (6 November 1923 – 4 July 1996), known as Clay Jones, was a horticulturist and broadcaster best known as the Chairman of the BBC Radio 4 programme Gardener's Question Time. At the age of 17, with a "rich baritone voice", he was invited to join the D'Oyly Carte opera company.

He came joint tenth with Carol Klein in the BBC poll for the nation's all-time favourite gardener.

He was appointed OBE in the 1990 Birthday Honours.

References

Further reading 
 Michael Leapman, "Obituary: Clay Jones", The Independent, 4 July 1996.

External links
BBC's all-time favourite gardener

British gardeners
Officers of the Order of the British Empire
1923 births
1996 deaths